Core rope memory is a form of read-only memory (ROM) for computers, first used in the 1960s by early NASA Mars space probes and then in the Apollo Guidance Computer (AGC) and programmed by the Massachusetts Institute of Technology (MIT) Instrumentation Lab and built by Raytheon.

Software written by MIT programmers was woven into core rope memory by female workers in factories. Some programmers nicknamed the finished product LOL memory, for Little Old Lady memory.

Memory density

By the standards of the time, a relatively large amount of data could be stored in a small installed volume of core rope memory: 72 kilobytes per cubic foot, or roughly 2.5 megabytes per cubic meter.  This was about 18 times the amount of magnetic core memory (within two cubic feet).

References

External links
 "Computer for Apollo" NASA/MIT film from 1965 which demonstrates how rope memory was manufactured.
 Visual Introduction to the Apollo Guidance Computer, part 3: Manufacturing the Apollo Guidance Computer. – By Raytheon; hosted by the  Library of the California Institute of Technology's History of Recent Science & Technology site (originally hosted by the Dibner Institute)
 Computers in Spaceflight: The NASA Experience – By James Tomayko (Chapter 2, Part 5, "The Apollo guidance computer: Hardware")
 Brent Hilpert's Core Rope & Woven-Wire Memory Systems page has a detailed explanation of pulse-transformer and switching-core techniques.
 SV3ORA's Core rope memory: A practical guide of how to build your own gives a description, schematics and photos of a simple core rope memory board using the pulse transformer technique, including a demonstration of operation.
 Software woven into wire: Core rope and the Apollo Guidance Computer, extensive blog post by computer restoration expert Ken Shirriff
 Australian 'ropes' demonstrated at MIT Letter from Ramon L. Alonso to Gordon Rose, dated 10 December 1963: "We are finding the Australian ideas on ‘ropes' to be very fruitful indeed, and we are going ahead with some development work on them."

Computer memory
Non-volatile memory